Lucienne Rouet (15 December 1901 – 3 July 1943) was a French swimmer. She competed in the women's 100 metre backstroke event at the 1924 Summer Olympics.

References

External links
 

1901 births
1943 deaths
French female backstroke swimmers
Olympic swimmers of France
Swimmers at the 1924 Summer Olympics
Place of birth missing
20th-century French women